Tanya Warren (born 1965) is an American basketball coach who is currently the head women's basketball coach at the University of Northern Iowa.

Early life and education
Born in Des Moines, Iowa, Warren graduated from Abraham Lincoln High School in 1983, then played basketball at Creighton University in Omaha, Nebraska from 1984 to 1988 at guard, after redshirting her freshman year. At Creighton, among Warren's teammates was Connie Yori, who would later coach at Nebraska. Warren averaged 13.9 points and 3.2 rebounds as a redshirt freshman in 1984–85. Warren averaged 14.6 points and 3.0 rebounds as a sophomore, 18.7 points and 3.8 rebounds as a junior, and 19.1 points, 4.5 rebounds, and 7.8 rebounds as a senior in a season where she only played 10 games.

Creighton statistics

Source

Coaching career
After graduating from Creighton, Warren remained in Omaha to be girls' basketball head coach at Boys Town High School. In 1992, Warren became head basketball coach at the Duchesne Academy of the Sacred Heart, a girls' Catholic school in Omaha. Two years later, Warren moved up to the collegiate ranks as an assistant coach at Iowa State.

From 1995 to 2001, Warren was an assistant coach at Northern Iowa under Tony DiCecco. Warren then was an assistant at Missouri from 2001 to 2004 under Cindy Stein and at Creighton from 2004 to 2007 under Jim Flanery.

In April 2007, Warren returned to Northern Iowa, this time as head coach. Warren led Northern Iowa to consecutive MVC tournament titles in 2010 and 2011, both of which led to automatic qualification for the NCAA tournament. Northern Iowa later became runner-up in the 2012 WBI and made the WNIT in 2013 and 2016.

On March 4, 2017, Warren became the all-time wins leader in Northern Iowa women's basketball history. She reached her 184th career win with a victory over Missouri State.

On January 22, 2021, Warren recorded her 250th Northern Iowa career win with a victory over Indiana State.

USA Basketball
Warren was selected to be the assistant coach of the USA representative to the World University Games held in Seoul, South Korea July 5–13, 2015. The team won all six games, including the championship game against Canada. The first three quarters the game were quite close with four ties and four lead changes. In the fourth quarter the USA exploded for 34 points to pull out to a large lead, and won the gold-medal with a score of 82–63.

Head coaching record

References

External links
Northern Iowa profile

1965 births
Living people
Basketball players from Des Moines, Iowa
Creighton Bluejays women's basketball players
Creighton Bluejays women's basketball coaches
High school basketball coaches in the United States
Iowa State Cyclones women's basketball coaches
Northern Iowa Panthers women's basketball coaches
American women's basketball coaches
American women's basketball players
Basketball coaches from Iowa
Missouri Tigers women's basketball coaches
Sportspeople from Des Moines, Iowa
Guards (basketball)